Schleicher may refer to:

Schleicher (surname), a German surname
Schleicher County, Texas, a county in Texas, United States
Schleicher (Hammond), a neighborhood of Hammond, Indiana, United States

See also
Alexander Schleicher GmbH & Co, a sailplane manufacturer